The  Cleveland Gladiators season was the 13th season for the franchise in the Arena Football League, and the fourth while in Cleveland. The team was coached by Steve Thonn and played their home games at Quicken Loans Arena. The Gladiators finished the season with an 8–10 record and did not qualify for the playoffs. In this season, the Gladiators became the first team in the history of the league to forfeit a game. They did so on June 8 when the players went on strike prior to a matchup against the Pittsburgh Power in week 14.

Standings

Schedule
The Gladiators began the season on the road against the Georgia Force on March 12. Their first home game was on March 26 against the Kansas City Command. They hosted the Chicago Rush on July 21 in their final regular season game.

 Due to a players' strike within the team, the Gladiators were unable to field enough players, and forfeited the game.

Final roster

References

Cleveland Gladiators
Cleveland Gladiators seasons
Cleve